"Pot of Gold" is the fifth and final single from Senegalese singer-songwriter Akon's debut studio album, Trouble. Released as a European-only single, the song failed to chart significantly anywhere, peaking at number 77 in the United Kingdom and at number 95 in Germany. The single was not released in the United States, making it Akon's only single to date not to be. A music video for the track, directed by Gil Green, was released to Akon's YouTube account on October 24, 2005. Two versions of the video were filmed: a clean version, and an explicit version, which has never been broadcast on television.

Track listing
 UK CD1
 "Pot of Gold" (Radio Edit) - 3:23
 "Belly Dancer (Bananza)" (Remix) (Feat. Kardinal Offishall) - 3:27

 UK CD2
 "Pot of Gold" (Radio Edit) - 3:23
 "Lonely" (AOL Sessions Live) - 3:41
 "Locked Up" (AOL Sessions Live) - 2:58

Charts

References

2005 singles
Akon songs
Contemporary R&B ballads
Music videos directed by Gil Green
2004 songs
Songs written by Akon
SRC Records singles